Long River Review is the University of Connecticut's award-winning annual literary magazine run by undergraduate students with the assistance of faculty staff.  It is currently coordinated by Professor Ellen Litman. Each year a selection and interview process is held to find the most qualified students to join the LRR staff. The Long River Review class is only offered once a year, for the production of the magazine in the springtime.

The class itself is divided into groups of focused panelists and specific position roles. Panelists comb through the multitude of submissions received every year to pick the very best pieces in fiction, poetry, creative non-fiction, or translations to publish. Students with position roles help make sure the magazine runs smoothly, overseeing various areas including editing, fundraising, copy editing, and social media. The class works together to produce a professional, fully realized magazine for sale. The process of creating this magazine helps students understand more about the literary publishing industry and get real hands-on experience working in a practical setting.

Along with written submissions, the Long River Review also accepts art submissions for publication in the magazine, accepting photographs, drawings, illustrations, comics, mixed media designs, and more.

Long River Review replaced Writing UConn : fiction, essays, poetry run by the Department of English from 1983–1997.''

Prizes
The following prizes are awarded each year by the magazine: 
 Edward R. & Frances Schreiber Collins Poetry Award
 Jennie Hackman Memorial Award for Short Fiction
 Wallace Stevens Poetry Prize

Editors
The following people have been the Editor-in-Chief of the magazine:

 2022 Nicole Catarino
 2021 Alexander Mika
 2020 Anna Zarra Aldrich
 2019 Siobhan Dale & Brianna McNish
 2018 Rebecca Hill
 2017 Stephanie Koo
 2016 Shannon Hearn
 2015 Lauren Silverio
 2014 Krisela Karaja
 2013 Alyssa Palazzo
 2012 Ryan Wiltzius
 2011 Joe Welch
 2010 Annie Brooks
 2009 Michael Pontacoloni
 2008 Nathan Harold
 2007 Jaclyn Allard
 2006 Christopher Venter
 2005 Jacob Overdurff 
 2004 Ashley Linden
 2003 Sarah Breckenridge
 2002 Julie Wernau
 2001 Nathan Fisher & Jessica Francassini
 2000 Stephani M. Dion
 1999 Marla Gelman & Tracey Lander
 1998 Michael Gore & Michael Schiavo

References

External links
 

Literary magazines published in the United States
Student magazines published in the United States
Annual magazines published in the United States
Magazines established in 1983
Magazines published in Connecticut
University of Connecticut